Shire of Mornington can relate to one of two Local government in Australia:

 The current Shire of Mornington (Queensland)
 The former Shire of Mornington (Victoria) (amalgamated into Shire of Mornington Peninsula)